is a Japanese manga illustrator from Aichi Prefecture. He has mainly participated in manga anthologies based from bishōjo games. As of June 2007, he has been illustrating the third Clannad manga adaptation.

Works
Happiness!
Lamune
Official Another Story Clannad: Hikari Mimamoru Sakamichi de (manga version)

External links
Rino Fujii's personal website 

Manga artists
Year of birth missing (living people)
Living people